Ashok Puna (born 19 February 1953) is a New Zealand cricketer. He played in one List A and ten first-class matches for Northern Districts from 1971 to 1973.

See also
 List of Northern Districts representative cricketers

References

External links
 

1953 births
Living people
New Zealand cricketers
Northern Districts cricketers
Cricketers from Hamilton, New Zealand